Enflé, Rolling Stone, Farbenjagd or Schweller is an early nineteenth-century French trick-taking card game for three or more players that has been described as a "simple but maddening game" having "a lot of similarity to Rams and no less entertaining." It has also been called "one of the best children's games."

Description 
Enflé is played with 32 French playing cards, or 52 if there are more than four players. The aim is to be the first to completely shed all one's cards. The card ranking is Aces high i.e. A K Q J 10 9 8 7 (6 5 4 3 2).

Players must follow suit and the highest card of the led suit wins the trick. The winner picks it up and discards the trick. There are no trumps. If a player is unable to follow suit he must pick up all the cards played to the current trick into their hand, and lead to the next.

As soon as a player empties their hand, the game ends and that player is the winner. In early rules, there is no scoring system; however Parlett (2008) states that the winner scores the total of the cards in the other players hands with Ace to 10 at face value and court cards counting 10.

References

Literature 
 _ (1983). "Schweller" in Erweitertes Spielregelbüchlein aus Altenburg, Verlag Altenburger Spielkartenfabrik, Leipzig, pp. 181ff
 
 Kastner, Hugo and Gerald Kador Folkvord (2005) "Rolling Stone" in  Die große Humboldtenzyklopädie der Kartenspiele. Humboldt, Baden-Baden,  pp. 359–360 (Auszug).
 
 Lebrun, M. (1828). Manuel des Jeux de Calcul et de Hazard. 2nd edn. Roret, Paris.
 
 Müller, Reiner F. (1994). Die bekanntesten Kartenspiele. Neff, Berlin.  (as Farbenjagd)
 
 

French deck card games
Multi-player card games
Shedding-type card games
Card games for children